Canadian singer Shania Twain has been honored numerous times since her debut. Her self-titled debut studio album Shania Twain (1993), was certified platinum by the RIAA. Her follow up The Woman In Me (1995), sold over 12 million copies in the US (Diamond) and 20 million copies worldwide. Twain's third studio album Come On Over (1997), is the best selling album in country music history and the best selling album of all time by a female artist in any genre, having sold over 40 million copies worldwide and being certified 2× Diamond in the US. Her fourth release Up! (2002), was also certified Diamond in the US. In 2003, she was the only female artist to have 3 consecutive albums certified Diamond in the US. Afterwards, Twain released her Greatest Hits (2004) package, which was certified 4× platinum in the US. Thirteen years later, she released her fifth studio album Now (2017), and it was certified platinum in the US. The following is a list of awards Twain has won throughout her career. In total, she has won 222 awards.

Academy of Country Music Awards

American Music Awards

Amigo Awards

Bambi Awards

Billboard Music Awards

BMI Songwriter Awards

Country Music Association Awards

Canadian Country Music Association Awards

Danish Music Awards

Echo Awards

Edison Music Awards

Juno Awards

Grammy Awards

Ivor Novello Awards

 
|-
| rowspan="4" | 2000
| "You're Still The One"
| Best Song Musically and Lyrically
|  
|-
| rowspan="3" | "That Don't Impress Me Much"
| Most Performed Work
| 
|- 
| International Hit of the Year 
|  
|-
| Best Selling UK Single
|

MTV Video Music Awards

NRJ Music Awards

World Music Awards

Awards by Year

1993 
CMT - (Europe): Rising Star

1995 
ABC Radio Networks Country Music Awards: Female Video Artist of the Year
Canadian Country Music Association Awards (CCMA's): Album of the Year - The Woman in Me 
Canadian Country Music Association Awards (CCMA's): Female Vocalist of the Year
Canadian Country Music Association Awards (CCMA's): Single of the Year - "Any Man of Mine"
Canadian Country Music Association Awards (CCMA's): SOCAN Song of the Year - "Whose Bed Have Your Boots Been Under?"
Canadian Country Music Association Awards (CCMA's): Video of the Year - "Any Man of Mine"
Country Music Radio Awards: Best Female Artist
Country Music Radio Awards: Single of the Year - "Any Man of Mine"
RPM's Big Country Music Awards - (Canada): Outstanding New Artist of the Year

1996 
Academy of Country Music Awards (ACMA's): Album of the Year - The Woman in Me
Academy of Country Music Awards (ACMA's): Top New Female Vocalist
American Music Awards (AMA's): Favorite New Country Artist
AOL Online Music Awards: Hottest Country Video - "Any Man of Mine"
Billboard Music Awards: Country Album of the Year - The Woman in Me *Billboard Music Awards: Female Country Artist of the Year
Blockbuster Entertainment Awards: Favorite New Country Artist 
BMI COUNTRY Songwriter Awards - (U.S.): One of the Most Performed Songs of the Year - "Any Man of Mine"
BMI COUNTRY Songwriter Awards - (U.S.): One of the Most Performed Songs of the Year - "(If You're Not in It for Love) I'm Outta Here!"
BMI POP Songwriter Awards - (U.S.): One of the Most Performed Songs of the Year - "Any Man of Mine"
BMI POP Songwriter Awards - (U.S.): One of the Most Performed Songs of the Year - "Whose Bed Have Your Boots Been Under?"
Canadian Country Music Association Awards (CCMA's): NCN Fan's Choice Entertainer of the Year
Canadian Country Music Association Awards (CCMA's): Female Vocalist of the Year
Canadian Country Music Association Awards (CCMA's): Video of the Year - "(If You're Not in It for Love) I'm Outta Here!"
CMT - (Canada): Female Video Artist of the Year 
CMT - (Europe): Female Artist of the Year 
CMT - (Europe): Video of the Year - "Any Man of Mine" 
CMT - (U.S.): Female Artist of the Year
First Americans in the Arts: Outstanding Musical Achievement Award
Golden Pick Awards: Favorite Album - The Woman In Me 
Golden Pick Awards: Favorite Video of the Year - "The Woman in Me (Needs the Man in You)"
Grammy Awards: Best Country Album - The Woman in Me
Great British Country Music Awards: International Rising Star
Jukebox Awards: Country Single of the Year - "Any Man of Mine"
Jukebox Awards: Songwriter of the Year 
Juno Awards: Country Female Vocalist of the Year
Juno Awards: Entertainer of the Year
Online Music Award: Best New Country Artist
Radio & Records' Trade Magazine Poll: Best Album - The Woman In Me 
Radio & Records' Trade Magazine Poll: Best Female Vocalist
Radio & Records' Trade Magazine Poll: Best New Artist
RPM's Big Country Music Awards - (Canada): Album of the Year - The Woman In Me
RPM's Big Country Music Awards - (Canada): Canadian Country Artist of the Year 
RPM's Big Country Music Awards - (Canada): Female Artist of the Year 
RPM's Big Country Music Awards - (Canada): Song of the Year - "Any Man of Mine"
RPM's Big Country Music Awards - (Canada): Songwriters of the Year - Shania Twain and R.J. "Mutt" Lange
SOCAN Awards: One of the Most Performed Songs of the Year - "Any Man of Mine" 
SOCAN Awards: One of the Most Performed Songs of the Year - "Whose Bed Have Your Boots Been Under?"
World Music Awards: World's Best Selling Female Country Artist

1997 
American Music Awards (AMA's): Favorite Female Country Artist
BMI COUNTRY Songwriter Awards - (U.S.): One of the Most Performed Songs of the Year - "No One Needs to Know"
BMI POP Songwriter Awards - (U.S.): One of the Most Performed Songs of the Year - "Any Man of Mine"
Canadian Country Music Association Awards (CCMA's): Special Achievement Award - The Woman in Me (Top selling album by a female country artist ever, selling over 12 million copies worldwide)
Canadian Country Music Association Awards (CCMA's): Top Selling Album - The Woman In Me
Juno Awards: Country Female Vocalist of the Year
Juno Awards: Juno International Achievement Award
RPM's Big Country Music Awards - (Canada): Songwriters of the Year - Shania Twain and R.J. "Mutt" Lange
SOCAN Awards: One of the Most Performed Songs of the Year - "(If You're Not in It for Love) I'm Outta Here!"
SOCAN Awards: One of the Most Performed Songs of the Year - "No One Needs to Know"

1998 
Billboard Music Awards: Best Selling Country Single - "You're Still the One" 
Billboard Music Awards: Female Artist of the Year (All categories)
Billboard Music Awards: Hot 100 Singles Female Artist
Billboard Music Video Awards: Best Country Clip - You're Still The One 
BMI COUNTRY Songwriter Awards - (U.S.): One of the Most Performed Songs of the Year - "Love Gets Me Every Time"
Canadian Country Music Association Awards (CCMA's): CMT Maple Leaf Foods Fan's Choice Award - Entertainer of the Year
Canadian Country Music Association Awards (CCMA's): Female Vocalist of the Year
Canadian Country Music Association Awards (CCMA's): Album of the Year - Come on Over 
Canadian Country Music Association Awards (CCMA's): Single of the Year - "You're Still the One"
Canadian Country Music Association Awards (CCMA's): Top Selling Album - Come on Over
Canadian Country Music Association Awards (CCMA's): Video of the Year - "Don't Be Stupid (You Know I Love You)"
CMT - (Canada): Female Video Artist of the Year
CMT - (Latin America): Female Artist of the Year 
CMT - (Latin America): Video of the Year - "You're Still the One" 
CMT - (Pacific): Female Artist of the Year
CMT - (U.S.): Female Artist of the Year
Juno Awards: Country Female Vocalist of the Year
MTV Video Music Awards: Nominated for Female Video of the Year - "You're Still the One" 
Nashville Songwriters Association International (NSAI): Songwriter/Artist of the Year
RPM's Big Country Music Awards - (Canada): Album of the Year - Come on Over 
RPM's Big Country Music Awards - (Canada): Canadian Country Artist of the Year
VH1 Viewer's Choice Awards: Sexiest Video - "You're Still the One"

1999 

Academy of Country Music Awards (ACMA's): Double-Diamond Award - The Woman in Me and Come on Over  
(Back to back albums selling over 10 million copies each in the U.S.)
American Music Awards (AMA's): Favorite Female Country Artist 
American Music Awards (AMA's): Favorite Country Album- Come On Over
 APRA Music Awards: Most Performed Foreign Work – "You're Still the One"
Blockbuster Entertainment Awards: Favorite Female Country Artist
Blockbuster Entertainment Awards: Favorite Single - "You're Still the One
BMI COUNTRY Songwriter Awards - (U.S.): Country Songwriter of the Year
BMI COUNTRY Songwriter Awards - (U.S.): Song of the Year - "You're Still the One"
BMI COUNTRY Songwriter Awards - (U.S.): One of the Most Performed Songs of the Year - "You're Still the One"
BMI COUNTRY Songwriter Awards - (U.S.): One of the Most Performed Songs of the Year - "Don't Be Stupid (You Know I Love You)"
BMI COUNTRY Songwriter Awards - (U.S.): One of the Most Performed Songs of the Year - "From This Moment On"
BMI COUNTRY Songwriter Awards - (U.S.): One of the Most Performed Songs of the Year - "Honey, I'm Home"
BMI POP Songwriter Awards - (U.S.): Pop Songwriter of the Year
BMI POP Songwriter Awards - (U.S.): Song of the Year - "You're Still the One"
BMI POP Songwriter Awards - (U.S.): One of the Most Performed Songs of the Year - "You're Still the One"
BMI POP Songwriter Awards - (U.S.): One of the Most Performed Songs of the Year - "From This Moment On"
BMI POP Songwriter Awards - (U.S.): One of the Most Performed Songs of the Year - "Love Gets Me Every Time"
Canadian Country Music Association Awards (CCMA's): CMT Maple Leaf Foods Fan's Choice Award - Entertainer of the Year
Canadian Country Music Association Awards (CCMA's): Female Vocalist of the Year
Canadian Country Music Association Awards (CCMA's): Video of the Year - "That Don't Impress Me Much"
Canadian Country Music Association Awards (CCMA's): Vocal/Instrumental Collaboration of the Year - "From This Moment On"
Country Music Association Awards (CMA's) - (U.S.): CMA International Artist Achievement 
Country Music Association Awards (CMA's) - (U.S.): Entertainer of the Year
CMT - (U.S.): Female Artist of the Year
Gazette Net Country Awards: Most Popular Female Artist
Grammy Awards - (U.S.): Best Country Song - "You're Still the One"
Grammy Awards - (U.S.): Best Female Country Vocal Performance - "You're Still the One"
Juno Awards: Best Country Female Vocalist
Modern Screen Magazine's Readers Ballot Awards: Favorite Female Vocalist
National Association of Record Merchandisers (NARM): Best Selling Country Record of the Year - Come on Over
Playboy's Reader Poll: Best Country Album - Come on Over 
Playboy's Reader Poll: Female Country Artist of the Year
Radio & Records Magazine: Female Country Artist of the Year
RPM's Big Country Music Awards - (Canada): Canadian Country Artist of the Year
RPM's Big Country Music Awards - (Canada): Female Vocalist of the Year
SOCAN Awards: One of the Most Performed Songs of the Year - "Don't Be Stupid (You Know I Love You)"
SOCAN Awards: One of the Most Performed Songs of the Year - "From This Moment On"
SOCAN Awards: One of the Most Performed Songs of the Year - "You're Still the One"
WB Radio Music Awards: Country/Young Country Artist of the Year
Yahoo! Internet Life Online Music Awards: Favorite Country Artist

2000 
Academy of Country Music Awards (ACMA's): Entertainer of the Year 
American Music Awards (AMA's): Favorite Female Country Artist
American Music Awards (AMA's): Favorite Female Pop/Rock Artist
Blockbuster Entertainment Awards: Favorite Female Country Artist
BMI COUNTRY Songwriter Awards - (U.S.): Country Songwriter of the Year
BMI COUNTRY Songwriter Awards - (U.S.): One of the Most Performed Songs of the Year - "Come on Over"
BMI COUNTRY Songwriter Awards - (U.S.): One of the Most Performed Songs of the Year - "Man! I Feel Like a Woman!"
BMI COUNTRY Songwriter Awards - (U.S.): One of the Most Performed Songs of the Year - "That Don't Impress Me Much"
BMI POP Songwriter Awards - (U.S.): Pop Songwriter of the Year
BMI POP Songwriter Awards - (U.S.): One of the Most Performed Songs of the Year - "You're Still the One"
BMI POP Songwriter Awards - (U.S.): One of the Most Performed Songs of the Year - "From This Moment On"
BMI POP Songwriter Awards - (U.S.): One of the Most Performed Songs of the Year - "Man! I Feel Like a Woman!"
BMI POP Songwriter Awards - (U.S.): One of the Most Performed Songs of the Year - "That Don't Impress Me Much"
BMI POP Songwriter Awards - (U.S.): One of the Most Performed Songs of the Year - "You've Got a Way"
Edison Awards - (Netherlands): Best International Female Artist
Grammy Awards - (U.S.): Best Country Song - "Come on Over"
Grammy Awards - (U.S.): Best Female Country Vocal Performance - "Man! I Feel Like a Woman!"
Grammy Awards - (Danish): Best Foreign Hit - "That Don't Impress Me Much"
Juno Awards: Best Country Female Artist 
Juno Awards: Best Songwriter
M6 Awards - (France): Best International Female Artist
MuchMusic Video Awards - (Canada): MuchMoreMusic Video Award - "Man! I Feel Like a Woman!"
People's Choice Awards - (U.S.): Favorite Female Musical Performer 
Playboy's Reader Poll: Female Country Artist of the Year
Radio & Records' Trade Magazine Poll: Performer of the Year
RPM's Big Country Music Awards - (Canada): Album of the Year - Come on Over
RPM's Big Country Music Awards - (Canada): Song of the Year - "Man! I Feel Like a Woman!"
SOCAN Awards: One of the Most Performed Songs of the Year - "From This Moment On" 
SOCAN Awards: One of the Most Performed Songs of the Year - "Man! I Feel Like a Woman!"
SOCAN Awards: One of the Most Performed Songs of the Year - "That Don't Impress Me Much"
SOCAN Awards: One of the Most Performed Songs of the Year - "You're Still the One" 
SOCAN Awards: One of the Most Performed Songs of the Year - "You've Got a Way"

2001 
BMI COUNTRY Songwriter Awards - (U.S.): One of the Most Performed Songs of the Year - "You've Got a Way"
World Music Awards: World's Best Selling Canadian Artist

2002
CMT's 40 Greatest Women In Country Music' Ranked #7.

2003 
Billboard Music Awards: Female Country Artist of the Year
Billboard Music Awards: Country Artist of the Year 
Billboard Music Awards: Country Album of the Year - Up! 
Billboard Music Awards: Country Albums Artist of the Year
BMI COUNTRY Songwriter Awards - (U.S.): One of the Most Performed Songs of the Year - "I'm Gonna Getcha Good!"
Canadian Country Music Association Awards (CCMA's): Female Artist of the Year
Canadian Country Music Association Awards (CCMA's): Video of the Year - "I'm Gonna Getcha Good!"
Canadian Country Music Association Awards (CCMA's): Top Selling Album - Up!
Canadian Country Music Association Awards (CCMA's): Album of the Year - Up!
CMT Flameworthy Awards - (U.S.): Concept Video of the Year - "I'm Gonna Getcha Good!" 
Juno Awards: Country Recording of the Year - "I'm Gonna Getcha Good!"
Juno Awards: Artist of the Year
Juno Awards: Fan's Choice Award
MuchMusic Video Awards - (Canada): MuchMoreMusic Video Award - "Up!"
Radio & Records Magazine: Top Female Country Airplay Artist of the Year 
Roughstock Awards: Female Artist of the Year
Sky Radio Airplay Award - (Holland): Sky Radio Airplay Award
VIVA Comet Awards - (Germany): Best International Act

2004 
Bambi Awards - (Germany): International Pop Artist of the Year
BMI COUNTRY Songwriter Awards - (U.S.): Song of the Year - "Forever and for Always"
BMI COUNTRY Songwriter Awards - (U.S.): One of the Most Performed Songs of the Year - "Forever and for Always"
BMI COUNTRY Songwriter Awards - (U.S.): One of the Most Performed Songs of the Year - "She's Not Just a Pretty Face"
BMI POP Songwriter Awards - (U.S.): One of the Most Performed Songs of the Year - "Forever and for Always"
BMI POP Songwriter Awards - (U.S.): One of the Most Performed Songs of the Year - "I'm Gonna Getcha Good!"
BMI Songwriter Awards - (Europe): Song of the Year - "Forever and for Always"
Canadian Country Music Awards (CCMA's): Country Music Program or Special of the Year - Up! Close and Personal
Canadian Radio Music Awards: Songwriter Award 
Canadian Radio Music Awards: "Chart Topper" Award
CMA Awards - (France): Best Live Performer
CMT Flameworthy Awards - (U.S.): Female Video of the Year - "Forever and for Always"
ECHO Awards - (Germany): Best International Female Artist
Juno Awards: Country Recording of the Year - "Up!"

2005 
Billboard Music Awards: Album of the year -  Greatest HitsOrder of Canada: OfficerBMI COUNTRY Songwriter Awards - (U.S.): One of the Most Performed Songs of the Year - "Party for Two"BMI COUNTRY Songwriter Awards - (U.S.): One of the Most Performed Songs of the Year - "It Only Hurts When I'm Breathing"BMI POP Songwriter Awards - (U.S.): One of the Most Performed Songs of the Year - "Forever and for Always"Canadian Country Music Association Awards (CCMA's): Top Selling Album - Greatest HitsCanadian Radio Music Awards: "Chart Topper" AwardMuchMusic Video Awards - (Canada): MuchMoreMusic Video Award - "Party for Two"People's Choice Awards - (U.S.): Favorite Country Female Singer

 2006 Canadian Radio Music Awards: "Chart Topper" Awards

 2008 Billboard Hot-100 50th Anniversary 
The Billboard Hot 100 All-Time Top Songs ranked #66 for "You're Still The One"
Top Billboard Hot 100 Country Songs ranked #3 for "You're Still The One"
Songs With The Most Weeks at No. 2 Without Reaching No. 1 ranked #4 for "You're Still The One"

  2015  Taste of Country Fan Choice Awards - Who had the best tour in 2015 - Shania Twain Rock This Country Tour  2016 
 CMT Artists' of the Year: Artist of a Lifetime Award
 Billboard Women in Music: Icon Award

  2018 
 CMC Music Awards ARIA Award for Highest Selling International Album of the Year Now
 Canadian Country Music Association Awards (CCMA's): Generation Award
 Canadian Country Music Association Awards (CCMA's): Top Selling Album - Now
 Canadian Country Music Association Awards (CCMA's): Top Selling Canadian Album - Now
 Canadian Country Music Association Awards (CCMA's): Apple Music Fan's Choice Award2022 Academy of Country Music Awards (ACMA's): ACM Poet's Award
 People's Choice Awards - (U.S.):''' Music Icon Award

References 

https://web.archive.org/web/20140907095855/http://www.shaniatwain.com/bio/shanias-awards/
Grammys.com

Awards
Twain, Shania